Adolf Scherbaum (23 August 1909 – 2 August 2000) was a trumpet player who specialised in the piccolo trumpet.

Scherbaum was born in the town of Eger, then in Austro-Hungarian Bohemia (now Cheb, Czech Republic). He studied in Prague and Vienna with Prof. Dengler. He received his first appointment as trumpet soloist at the Landestheater in Brünn (Brno), followed by performances in Prague at the Deutsche Philharmonie under Joseph Keilberth and in Berlin with the Berlin Philharmonic under Wilhelm Furtwängler.

After the chaos following World War II, he was appointed to the Musikhochschule in Bratislava. After he was able to leave legally and travel to West Germany, he performed with the Norddeutscher Rundfunk in Hamburg and taught at the Hochschule für Musik Saar, Saarbrücken.

In 1962/1963, Scherbaum toured in North America, where he performed as a soloist with various orchestras. He died in 2000 in Sulzbach-Rosenberg, a few days before his 91st birthday.

References

External links
 Michael Latcham Musique ancienne - instruments et imagination / Music of the past - instruments and imagination (Publications de la Societe Suisse de Musicologie: Serie II) (French, English)
 Profile and interview

1909 births
2000 deaths
20th-century German people
20th-century classical musicians
German classical trumpeters
Male trumpeters
German Bohemian people
Academic staff of the Hochschule für Musik Saar
Naturalized citizens of Germany
Players of the Berlin Philharmonic
People from Cheb
20th-century German musicians
20th-century German male musicians